Nazmul Hossain (born 11 September 1987), commonly referred to as Nazmul Hossain Milon is a Bangladeshi cricketer. He is a right-handed batsman and right-arm medium bowler and has represented Dhaka Division and Sylhet Division in first-class.

Career overview

In the 2005–6 season he played for the Bangladesh national under-19 cricket team in both one day international and limited overs matches.
Hossain made his first-class debut for Dhaka Division in February 2007 and scored one first-class fifty in his maiden season, an unbeaten 65 against Khulna Division. His best performance in one day cricket came in April 2007 against Rajshahi Division, batting at number 8 Hossain scored 144 off just 89 an innings including 11 fours and 9 sixes.

References

External links
 

Bangladeshi cricketers
Dhaka Division cricketers
Sylhet Division cricketers
Khulna Tigers cricketers
Living people
Sylhet Strikers cricketers
Mohammedan Sporting Club cricketers
Legends of Rupganj cricketers
Abahani Limited cricketers
Cricket Coaching School cricketers
Bangladesh East Zone cricketers
1987 births
People from Tangail District
City Club cricketers